Gabrielle Leonie Ngaska (born 14 April 1988) is a Cameroonian footballer who plays as a forward for Spanish Primera Nacional club FF La Solana. She played for the Cameroon women's national team at the 2012 African Women's Championship.

References

External links

Gabrielle Ngaska on AupaAthletic.com 

1988 births
Living people
Women's association football forwards
Cameroonian women's footballers
People from Centre Region (Cameroon)
Cameroon women's international footballers
2. Frauen-Bundesliga players
SC 07 Bad Neuenahr players
ŽFK Spartak Subotica players
Fundación Albacete players
Primera División (women) players
Cameroonian expatriate women's footballers
Cameroonian expatriate sportspeople in Germany
Expatriate women's footballers in Germany
Cameroonian expatriate sportspeople in Serbia
Expatriate women's footballers in Serbia
Cameroonian expatriate sportspeople in Spain
Expatriate women's footballers in Spain